Frank Livingstone (1 August 1886 – 17 August 1966) was a New Zealand lawn bowls player.

Bowls career
At the 1938 British Empire Games in Sydney he won the men's singles silver medal. Livingstone died on 17 August 1966 and was buried at Waikaraka Cemetery in Onehunga.

In 2013, Livingstone was an inaugural inductee into the Bowls New Zealand Hall of Fame.

He won the 1936 & 1952 singles titles, 1949 & 1962 pairs titles and 1940 & 1948 fours titles at the New Zealand National Bowls Championships and also won the Australian National Bowls Championships singles title in 1949 (all when bowling for the Onehunga Bowls Club).

References

1886 births
1966 deaths
New Zealand male bowls players
Commonwealth Games silver medallists for New Zealand
Bowls players at the 1938 British Empire Games
Burials at Waikaraka Cemetery
Commonwealth Games medallists in lawn bowls
Place of birth missing
19th-century New Zealand people
20th-century New Zealand people
Medallists at the 1938 British Empire Games